The Jardin botanique et verger de La Bussière is a botanical garden located in La Bussière, Vienne, Nouvelle-Aquitaine, France. The garden contains 300 types of medicinal and edible plants including roses and fruit trees. An admission fee is charged.

See also 
 Château de La Bussière in La Bussière, Loiret, which also contains a garden
 List of botanical gardens in France

References 
 La Faverie description
 Tourisme Vienne description (French)
 Gralon entry (French)

Gardens in Vienne
Botanical gardens in France